Leandro dos Santos Oliveira (born 29 October 1986), or simply Leandro, is a Brazilian professional footballer who plays mainly as a midfielder but can also play as a defensive midfielder.

Club career

Army United
Leandro dos Santos joined Thai club Army United in 2011. He made an impressive start to his Army United career by scoring 4 goals in his first 4 appearances.

Perak
On 9 June 2017, Leandro dos Santos signed with Malaysian side Perak.

Career statistics

Club

Honours

Club
Bangkok Glass
 Thai FA Cup runner-up: 2013
Selangor
 Malaysia Cup winner: 2015
Perak TBG F.C.
 Malaysia Cup winner: 2018
 Malaysia Super League runner up: 2018

References

1986 births
Living people
Brazilian footballers
Expatriate footballers in Thailand
Leandro dos Santos
Brazilian expatriate footballers
Brazilian expatriate sportspeople in Thailand
Expatriate footballers in Malaysia
Selangor FA players
Perak F.C. players
Association football forwards
Association football midfielders
Luverdense Esporte Clube players
Terengganu F.C. II players
Leandro dos Santos
Sportspeople from Niterói